Paraglaciecola agarilytica is a Gram-negative, slightly halophilic and aerobic bacterium from the genus Paraglaciecola which has been isolated from sediments from the Sea of Japan.

References

External links
Type strain of Paraglaciecola agarilytica at BacDive -  the Bacterial Diversity Metadatabase

Bacteria described in 2007
Alteromonadales